Troy Milam (born June 30, 1980) is an American professional ice hockey defenseman who is currently playing for Anyang Halla of the Asia League Ice Hockey (ALIH).

Playing career
Undrafted, Milam was a graduate of Ferris State University and Lake Orion High School. He played 4 years for Ferris State University, and also the Hershey Bears of the AHL and the Gwinnett Gladiators of the ECHL.  While attending Ferris State Troy volunteered his time and services to help out local charities and children.  Troy Milam remains a legend in the town of Big Rapids today.

On November 25, 2009, Milam belatedly signed for Ässät after an off-season rehab from an injury since last season whilst with Ives of the then Finnish SM-liiga.

Milam left HC Sparta Praha of the Czech Extraliga, signing with Austrian outfit, EC Red Bull Salzburg of the Austrian Hockey League on July 2, 2013.

After two successful seasons with Salzburg, Milam was opted to sign with Austrian rivals, the Vienna Capitals on June 5, 2015. He left the Capitals upon the conclusion of the 2015-16 season and headed to Germany, signing with the Iserlohn Roosters of the top-flight Deutsche Eishockey Liga (DEL) on June 18, 2016.

Career statistics

Awards and honours

References

External links

 

1980 births
Living people
American expatriate ice hockey players in Austria
American expatriate ice hockey players in the Czech Republic
American expatriate ice hockey players in Finland
American men's ice hockey defensemen
Ässät players
Chicago Wolves players
Compuware Ambassadors players
Ferris State Bulldogs men's ice hockey players
Gwinnett Gladiators players
Hershey Bears players
High1 players
Ice hockey players from Michigan
Ilves players
Iserlohn Roosters players
Manchester Monarchs (AHL) players
HK Nitra players
Norfolk Admirals players
People from Lake Orion, Michigan
Reading Royals players
EC Red Bull Salzburg players
San Antonio Rampage players
HC Sparta Praha players
Vienna Capitals players
American expatriate ice hockey players in England
American expatriate ice hockey players in Slovakia
American expatriate ice hockey players in South Korea
American expatriate ice hockey players in Germany
HL Anyang players